Elections to Coleraine Borough Council were held on 19 May 1993 on the same day as the other Northern Irish local government elections. The election used four district electoral areas to elect a total of 22 councillors.

Election results

Note: "Votes" are the first preference votes.

Districts summary

|- class="unsortable" align="centre"
!rowspan=2 align="left"|Ward
! % 
!Cllrs
! % 
!Cllrs
! %
!Cllrs
! %
!Cllrs
! % 
!Cllrs
!rowspan=2|TotalCllrs
|- class="unsortable" align="center"
!colspan=2 bgcolor="" | UUP
!colspan=2 bgcolor="" | DUP
!colspan=2 bgcolor="" | SDLP
!colspan=2 bgcolor="" | Alliance
!colspan=2 bgcolor="white"| Others
|-
|align="left"|Bann
|bgcolor="40BFF5"|55.8
|bgcolor="40BFF5"|3
|12.3
|1
|29.2
|2
|2.7
|0
|0.0
|0
|6
|-
|align="left"|Coleraine Central
|bgcolor="40BFF5"|45.9
|bgcolor="40BFF5"|3
|26.9
|1
|12.1
|1
|9.4
|1
|5.7
|0
|6
|-
|align="left"|Coleraine East
|bgcolor="40BFF5"|57.8
|bgcolor="40BFF5"|3
|29.7
|2
|0.0
|0
|10.2
|0
|2.3
|0
|5
|-
|align="left"|The Skerries
|bgcolor="40BFF5"|42.0
|bgcolor="40BFF5"|3
|23.1
|1
|29.2
|1
|0.0
|0
|5.7
|0
|5
|-
|- class="unsortable" class="sortbottom" style="background:#C9C9C9"
|align="left"| Total
|50.4
|12
|21.8
|5
|12.7
|3
|11.8
|2
|3.3
|0
|22
|-
|}

District results

Bann

1993: 3 x UUP, 2 x SDLP, 1 x DUP

Coleraine Central

1993: 3 x UUP, 1 x DUP, 1 x SDLP, 1 x Alliance

Coleraine East

1993: 3 x UUP, 2 x DUP

The Skerries

1993: 3 x UUP, 1 x DUP, 1 x Alliance

References

Coleraine Borough Council elections
Coleraine